The European and African Zone is one of three zones of regional Davis Cup competition in 2009.

Group I

Group II

Group III

Section A

Group A

Group B

Promotion Play-Off Group

Relegation Play-Off Group

Section B

Group A

Group B

Promotion Play-Off Group

Relegation Play-Off Group

Group IV

External links
Davis Cup draw details

 
Europe Africa Zone
Davis Cup Europe/Africa Zone